The Chairman of the Executive Committee of the Palestine Liberation Organization (or Chairman of the Palestine Liberation Organization) is the leader of the Executive Committee (EC) of the Palestine Liberation Organization (PLO), the executive body of the PLO, which was established in 1964. The Chairman represents the PLO and the Palestinian people before the international community, including the United Nations. The Chairman is chosen by the members of the PLO EC. Since 29 October 2004, Mahmoud Abbas has been the Chairman of the PLO EC.

History
Yasser Arafat was appointed leader of the PLO on 4 February 1969 at the meeting of the Palestinian National Council (PNC) in Cairo. He continued to be PLO leader (sometimes called Chairman, sometimes President) for 35 years, until his death on 11 November 2004. Mahmoud Abbas was acting Chairman from 29 October 2004 to 11 November 2004, while Arafat was incapacitated, and was Chairman after that date.

On 22 August 2015, Mahmoud Abbas announced his resignation as a member and Chairman of the PLO Executive Committee. However, his resignation was conditional on the approval of the PNC, which was called for 15 September. Many Palestinians saw the move as just an attempt to replace some members in the Executive Committee, or to force a meeting of the PNC and remain in their jobs until the PNC decides whether to accept or to reject their resignations. The announcement was criticised by many Palestinian factions, as the PNC had not met for nearly 20 years, and had been postponed indefinitely. The Executive Committee members who announced their resignations were to continue to hold their positions until the PNC meets.

List of chairmen (1964–present)

See also

 Leaders of Palestinian institutions
 Palestinian Ambassador to the United Nations
 President of the State of Palestine
 President of the Palestinian National Authority
 Prime Minister of the Palestinian National Authority
 Speaker of the Palestinian Legislative Council

References

Bibliography

External sources
 Official document signed by the "Chairman of the Executive Committee of the Palestine Liberation Organization"

Palestine Liberation Organization